Luz Olvera (born 1 April 1994) is a Mexican judoka. At the 2019 Pan American Games held in Lima, Peru, she won the silver medal in the women's 52 kg event. She lost against Larissa Pimenta of Brazil in the final.

She competed in the women's 52 kg event at the 2014 World Judo Championships held in Chelyabinsk, Russia. She was eliminated in her first match by Rim Song-sim of North Korea.

In 2019, she competed in the women's 52 kg event at the 2019 World Judo Championships held in Tokyo, Japan. She was eliminated in her second match by Majlinda Kelmendi of Kosovo. In 2020, she won the silver medal in the women's 52 kg event at the 2020 Pan American Judo Championships held in Guadalajara, Mexico.

References

External links
 

Living people
1994 births
Place of birth missing (living people)
Mexican female judoka
Pan American Games medalists in judo
Pan American Games silver medalists for Mexico
Judoka at the 2019 Pan American Games
Medalists at the 2019 Pan American Games
21st-century Mexican women